Tanaji is a given name. Notable people with the name include:

Tanaji Malusare (died 1670), military leader of the Maratha Empire
 Tanhaji,  2020 Indian biographical film on the life of Tanaji Malusare
Tanaji Sakharamji Mutkule, Indian Marathi politician
Tanaji Sawant, Indian Marathi politician

Indian given names